Sam Shendi is an Egyptian-born, British sculptor. He uses contemporary industrial material, steel, stainless steel, aluminium and fibreglass to create his figurative work. He lives and works in North Yorkshire.

Early life
Sam Shendi was born in 1975 on the Nile Delta in a small town called Dekernes. He graduated from the Helwan University of Fine Arts in Cairo in 1997 with a first class honours degree in Sculpture and Architecture. In 1996 he won the Mahmoud Mokhtar Sculpture Award. Shendi moved to Britain in 2000 and became a member of the Royal British Society of Sculptors in 2014.

Work

Shendi's early work in bronze and stainless steel often explored notions of balance, joy and contentment. Shendi's recent semi-abstracted figures are made in rich curving colours with a wacky sense of fun. Although they have the sleek precision of mechanical production, each is hand-made using industrial, contemporary materials like car filler and spray-paint, and hours of manual sanding. Some figures are loosely human, others hybrid animal or bird, drawing on the art and architecture of his Egyptian background.

Awards
The First@108 Public Art Award by the Royal British Society of Sculptors (2013)
The Mahmoud Mokhtar Sculpture Award (1996)
Liverpool Plinth winner 2019

Select exhibitions
Seasons, Solo exhibition, Graham's Fine Art Gallery, Johannesburg (2017)
Mother and Child, Solo exhibition, The Civic, Barnsley (2016–2017)
Body and Soul, Solo exhibition, Munich, Germany (2015)
FLUX, Group Exhibition, The Rag Factory, London (2015)
Only Human, Solo exhibition, Cartwright Museum and Gallery, Bradford (2014–2015)
First @108, Solo exhibition, The Royal British Society of Sculptors, London (2014)
International Exhibition of Contemporary Art, De Oude Kerk, Amsterdam (2012)
Art in Mind, Group Show, Brick Lane Gallery, London (2011)

Public art
Art in the Park, Lister Park, Bradford (2014–2015)
Public sculpture for the Nail, Silsden, West Yorkshire (2011)
God's Eye in Craven Baptist Church for its 300-year celebration, Sutton-in-Craven, North Yorkshire (2011)
Split Decisions, the winner of the 2019 Liverpool Plinth

Art market
Shendi is represented by Graham's Fine Art Gallery, Johannesburg. Shendi's work has been collected by art collectors and organisations in South Africa, Panama, Taiwan, Germany, United Kingdom and United States.

Images
 'Anvil' and 'Moving Forward', part of the "Only Human" collection.

References

External links
 Sam Shendi

Living people
1975 births
British sculptors
British contemporary artists
Egyptian sculptors